Eucalyptus purpurata, commonly known as the Bandalup silver mallet, is a species of mallet that is endemic to a small area in the southwest of Western Australia. It has smooth, silvery bark, glossy dark green, lance-shaped adult leaves, flower buds in groups of between seven and eleven, creamy white flowers and shortened spherical fruit.

Description
Eucalyptus purpurata is a mallet that typically grows to a height of  but does not form a lignotuber. It has smooth, silvery grey bark that is shed in strips to reveal cream-coloured new bark. Flowering has been recorded in November and the flowers are creamy white.

Taxonomy
Eucalyptus purpurata was first formally described in 2002 by Dean Nicolle in the journal Nuytsia from material collected Bandalup Hill near Ravensthorpe. The specific epithet (purpurata) is from the Latin purpuratus meaning "purple" referring to the purplish new growth of this mallet.

Distribution and habitat
The Bandalup silver mallet occurs in more or less pure stands but is only known from the type location where it grows in white powdery soil containing magnesite.

Conservation status
This eucalypt is classified as "Threatened Flora (Declared Rare Flora — Extant)" by the Department of Environment and Conservation (Western Australia) and as "critically endangered" on the IUCN Red List.

See also
List of Eucalyptus species

References

Eucalypts of Western Australia
purpurata
Myrtales of Australia
Plants described in 2002